Mind Field is an American streaming television series produced exclusively for YouTube Premium, created and presented by Michael Stevens, the creator of the YouTube channel Vsauce. The format of the series is based heavily on that of Vsauce, with Stevens presenting documentary-style episodes which focus on aspects of human behavior, particularly the brain and the influences of consciousness. Every episode contains one or more experiments, in which either volunteers or Stevens himself participates, that relates to the topic of the episode. For example, in episode one, Stevens locks himself in an empty room for three days in order to investigate the effects of sensory deprivation on the brain.

Three seasons of Mind Field have been released on Vsauce, each one with eight episodes. The first season ran in early 2017, the second season from late 2017 to early 2018, and the third from late 2018 to early 2019. On October 1, 2019, all episodes became watchable with ads for free for those without YouTube Premium. On October 24, 2019, a special episode entitled "What Is the Scariest Thing?" was released.

Episodes

Season 1 (2017)

Season 2 (2017–18)

Season 3 (2018–19)

Special episodes (2019–present)

References

External links

YouTube Premium original series
2017 web series debuts
Philosophy television series